John Delvicchio "Deke" Cooper (born October 18, 1977) is a former American football safety. He was signed by the Arizona Cardinals as an undrafted free agent in 2000. He played college football at Notre Dame.

Early years
Cooper attended North High School in Evansville, Indiana where he reached the finals of the Indiana High School Athletic Association's State Championship Football Playoffs.  Cooper was nominated for the 1995 Mr. Football Award.  Cooper also played basketball and was a state meet qualifier in four events (300 Hurdles, Long Jump, High Jump, and 4x100 Relay) in Track and Field.

College career
At the University of Notre Dame, Cooper played in 45 games with 25 starts and totaled 203 tackles, six interceptions, four fumble recoveries, seven forced fumbles and five passes defensed, returning one fumble for a touchdown. Cooper graduated from Notre Dame in 2000 with a degree in sociology.

Professional career

Early career (2000–2002)
Following the 2000 NFL Draft on April 28, 2000, he was signed by the Arizona Cardinals as an undrafted free agent. In the spring of 2001, the Cardinals allocated Cooper to the Rhein Fire of NFL Europe. Earning All-NFL Europe honors, Cooper started 10 games and led NFL Europe with six interceptions in 2001. The Cardinals waived Cooper on September 2, 2001. On September 20, Cooper signed with the Cleveland Browns practice squad before being released on October 9, 2001.

Cooper signed on January 16, 2002 with the Carolina Panthers. That spring, Cooper had his second assignment with the Rhein Fire. Again starting 10 games, Cooper had 54 tackles, five interceptions, and eight passes defended for the Fire and earned Defensive MVP and all-league honors from NFL Europe. In his first season with NFL game appearances, Cooper played in 10 games with two tackles for the Panthers in 2002. The Panthers waived Cooper on August 31, 2003.

Jacksonville Jaguars (2003–2005)
On September 16, 2003, Cooper signed with the Jacksonville Jaguars. Playing in 14 games with 10 starts at free safety in 2003, Cooper had 60 tackles, one interception, four passes defended, and one fumble recovery. In 2004, Cooper played in all 16 games as a backup, with 38 tackles, one interception, two passes defended, and two forced fumbles. His one interception in 2004 sealed a 22–16 win over the Kansas City Chiefs, as Cooper intercepted a Hail Mary pass by Trent Green on the final play of the game. Cooper returned to a starting role in 2005, this time at strong safety. In 16 games with 12 starts, Cooper had 58 tackles, one interception, five passes defended, and one fumble recovery.

Later career (2006–2008)
Cooper signed with the Miami Dolphins as an unrestricted free agent on April 6, 2006 but was released on September 2. On December 18 that year, Cooper signed with the San Francisco 49ers, and he appeared in the 49ers' season finale on December 31, a 26–23 win at the Denver Broncos.

On March 26, 2007, he signed with the Panthers for the second time. Again starting at strong safety in 2007, Cooper played in 16 games with 15 starts. Cooper had 59 tackles, a career high three interceptions, four passes defended, and one forced fumble.

On June 18, 2008, he signed with the Atlanta Falcons. Following the preseason, the Falcons released Cooper on August 30.

Personal life
Cooper married Gwen Crisp in 2006. They have six children. After retiring from football, Cooper founded Future Leaders Christian Academy, a day care center in the Atlanta area.

References

External links
NFL.com profile
Atlanta Falcons bio

1977 births
Living people
People from Swainsboro, Georgia
Sportspeople from Evansville, Indiana
American football safeties
Notre Dame Fighting Irish football players
Arizona Cardinals players
Cleveland Browns players
Carolina Panthers players
Rhein Fire players
Jacksonville Jaguars players
Miami Dolphins players
Players of American football from Indiana
Players of American football from Georgia (U.S. state)
San Francisco 49ers players